The Out-of-Door Academy is a college preparatory school in Sarasota, Florida. It serves students in prekindergarten through grade 12 on two campuses in the Sarasota area, one on Siesta Key and one in Lakewood Ranch, the Upper School Uihlein Campus.

History 
The Out-of-Door School was established in 1924 by Fanneal Harrison and Catherine Gavin, followers of Belgian progressive education pioneer Ovide Decroly. Classes and free time were spent outside on the school's  campus on Siesta Key, with wooden cabins serving as classrooms during inclement weather and dormitories. Over time, the classes were held indoors. In 1977, the school was purchased by 120 school families and transformed into a nonprofit organization, at which point the school became known as Out-of-Door Academy.

The Lakewood Ranch campus was established in 1996. Seventh and 8th grades were moved to the new campus in 2000, and in 2008 the campus became known as the Uihlein Campus at Lakewood Ranch. The 6th grade was later moved to the Uihlein Campus in 2012.

The Out-of-Door Academy is accredited by the Florida Council of Independent Schools and the Florida Kindergarten Council. The school is a member of the Cum Laude Society, the National Association of Independent Schools, the Council for Spiritual and Ethical Education, and the Council for Advancement and Support of Education.

Campus 

The 5-acre Siesta Key Lower School Campus is on the National Register of Historic Places as Out-of-Door School. Located on Siesta Key in Sarasota County, FL, the Lower Campus is the only school in the U.S. located on a barrier island. The 90-acre (360,000 m2) Uihlein Campus, home to the Middle and Upper Schools is located in Lakewood Ranch.

The Siesta Key Lower School campus is on the National Register of Historic Places as Out-of-Door School. In 2017, the School partnered with Mote Marine Laboratory to create a Marine Biology classroom equipped with six oversized aquariums and an interactive touch tank for students. ODA demonstrates a commitment to sustainability with installation of more than 550 solar panels throughout the Historic Siesta Key Campus, one of the biggest solar projects in the region.

Renovation of the Siesta Key Campus began in 2008, and included the construction of a three-story academic building and covered athletic pavilion. Final renovations of the historic administrative building were completed in 2021.
The 90-acre (360,000 m2) Uihlein Campus is located at Lakewood Ranch. The Uihlein Campus is home to the Middle and Upper Schools, serving grades 6-12.

The Uihlein Campus consists of 12 main buildings which include a performing arts center which houses The Black Box Theater, the Savidge/Bowers Library, two Dart STEM labs, an augmented reality lab, makerspace labs, the Dick Vitale Family Student Center, Petrik Family Commons, in addition to classrooms. Athletics facilities include the Petrik Thunderdome, Gelbman Family Wellness Center, Uihlein Sports Complex, the Dietrich Family Sports Complex and Taylor Emmons Memorial Baseball Field, Malisoff Tennis Center, Thunder Athletic Complex, and Fox Field House.

Construction began in 2008 for a performing arts center at the Uihlein Campus at Lakewood Ranch, and the center opened in 2009. Renovation of the Siesta Key campus and construction of new athletic facilities also began in 2008.

Construction of a Middle School Campus (Dart STEM Center, Summer Breeze Center) was completed in 2020 adding more than 13,500 square feet of instructional space. The new building includes a STEM lab, augmented reality/AV lab, makerspace, art studio, and student commons in addition to flexible classrooms and learning spaces for core coursework.
ODA installed 705 solar panels at the Uihlein campus in 2020 reducing energy consumption 65%; an additional 905 panels in 2021 further reduced commercial energy reliance.

Curriculum 
The academy's curriculum is a balanced liberal arts program that includes mathematics, English, science, social studies, Foreign Language including Spanish, Latin,  and Mandarin Chinese, and music and visual and performing arts.  Advanced Placement (AP) and honors courses are available.

STEM Science 
As of September 2, 2014, the school leadership and lead donors officially broke ground on the Dick Vitale Family Student Center, founded by Dick Vitale and Dart Foundation STEM Center, the newest facility for The Out-of-Door Academy. This center was envisioned as a college-like campus center where students could congregate between classes, or have a place to study.

Athletics 
The Out-of-Door Academy’s 2021 Baseball Team won the FHSAA Class 2A state title 2018 Boys Tennis Team earned the FHSAA Class 1A state title. ODA holds 12 state champion titles in individual sports, including tennis, golf, and track & field.

Extracurricular activities 
Student groups and activities include art club, community service club, drama club, National Honor Society, newspaper, Relay for Life, science/environmental club, student council, Tri-M Music Honors Society, Key Club, Invisible Children, and yearbook. 100 hours of Community service are required for upper school students in order to graduate from the school.

The Out-of-Door Academy athletic teams, known as the Thunder, compete in interscholastic competition in baseball, basketball, cheerleading, cross country, football, golf, lacrosse, sailing, soccer, softball, swimming, tennis, track & field, and volleyball.

Accolades 
In 2006, Out-of-Door Academy was recognized as a Cum Laude Society School, a distinction reserved for the top 1% of all secondary schools in the United States. Out-of-Door Academy is regularly voted "Best Private School" by Sarasota magazine.

References

External links 

 Out-of-Door Academy

Educational institutions established in 1924
Private elementary schools in Florida
High schools in Sarasota County, Florida
Private middle schools in Florida
Private high schools in Florida
Preparatory schools in Florida
Buildings and structures in Sarasota, Florida
1924 establishments in Florida
School buildings on the National Register of Historic Places in Florida